Maris Taylor Fravel is an American scholar and author. He specializes in the areas of international relations, international security and territorial disputes.

Background 
Fravel earned his BA in history (summa cum laude) from Middlebury College in 1993, MA in philosophy, politics and economics from New College, Oxford as a Rhodes Scholar in 1995, MS in international relations (with distinction) from London School of Economics, and PhD in political science from Stanford University in 2004. Taylor Fravel is the Director of the Security Studies Program at Massachusetts Institute of Technology (MIT) and is associated with Princeton University and the American Academy of Arts and Sciences. He is a member of the board of directors for the National Committee on U.S.-China Relations.

Publications 
He is on the editorial boards of and has been published in journals including International Studies Quarterly, Security Studies, Journal of Strategic Studies, and The China Quarterly. Books authored include  two volumes of 'Princeton Studies in International Relations and History':

 Active Defense: China’s Military Strategy Since 1949. Princeton University Press, 2020. 
 Strong Borders, Secure Nation: Conflict and Cooperation in China’s Territorial Disputes. Princeton University Press, 2008.

References

Further reading 

 Ankit Panda (30 January 2019). M. Taylor Fravel on How the People’s Liberation Army Does Military Strategy. The Diplomat

Living people
Harvard University people
Massachusetts Institute of Technology people
Alumni of the University of Oxford
American Rhodes Scholars
Year of birth missing (living people)